Poochakkal is part of a small island consisting Arookutty, Panavally, Thycattusserry and Pallippuram Panchayaths close to the Kerala Backwaters in Kerala, India. Until the 2006 Kerala Assembly Elections, Poochakkal was part of the Cherthala LAC. After delimitation from the 2011 elections, it became a part of Aroor LAC.

Location

Poochakkal is located about 2 miles (3.22 km) from Vaduthala(Arookutty), 8 miles (14 km) from Cherthala, about 5 miles (8 km) from Vaikom, 12 miles (20 km) from Vytilla Hub and 15 miles (25 km) from Ernakulam.

Economy
The  economy was based on a water transportation system. Its water canal connects the eastern and western parts of Vembanadu Lake. Now it is directly connected to NH47 at two places by new road bridges at Aroor and Thuravoor. Also new bridge is under construction connecting to Vaikom.

Notable people

 Saiju Kurup, Indian actor

Location

References

Islands of Kerala
Populated places in India
Islands of India